Cisco is an American computer networking company. Cisco made its first acquisition in 1993, which was followed by a series of further acquisitions.

History
Founded in 1984, Cisco did not acquire a company during the first seven years of its existence; but, on September 24, 1993, Cisco acquired Crescendo Communications, a LAN switching company. Following the first Cisco takeover purchase, acquisitions have constituted 50 percent of the company's business activity.

The company's largest acquisition  is the purchase of Scientific-Atlanta—a manufacturer of cable television, telecommunications and broadband equipment—for US$6.9 billion. The purchase represented the interest that Cisco had in Internet television, as spending on switches and routers decreased, and expanded the corporation's consumer product base after its prior acquisition of Linksys Inc., a producer of wireless networking products for homes and small businesses. Cisco chief executive officer (CEO) at the time, John Chambers, described it as a "medium-sized" purchase, but the acquisition was the largest since Cisco paid US$7.29 billion for Cerent Corporation in 1999. The deal was announced in November 2005 and was finalized in early 2006.

The majority of companies acquired by Cisco are based in the United States (U.S.) and a total of 149 companies have been acquired . Most of the companies acquired by Cisco are related to computer networking, with several LAN switching and Voice over Internet Protocol (VoIP) companies included in the list of acquisitions.

Acquisitions
Each acquisition is for the respective company in its entirety, unless otherwise specified, and the date of the agreement between Cisco Systems and the subject of the acquisition is listed. The value of each acquisition is listed in the US$ currency because Cisco Systems is headquartered in California, U.S.

The majority of its products and business units have come from acquisitions, with Cisco Systems spending more than 70 billion dollars to acquire approximately 218 organizations as of October, 2021.

See also
Composite Software

References

External links
Official website (Acquisitions)

 
Cisco Systems